La Tormenta (The Storm) is a 2005 Colombian telenovela and original story by Humberto "Kiko" Olivieri, produced by RTI Colombia and broadcast by Telemundo. The series stars Natalia Streignard and Christian Meier as the main protagonists, with Natasha Klauss, Kristina Lilley, Marcelo Buquet, and Didier van der Hove as the main villains of the story. Also noted are the stellar performances of Aura Cristina Geithner, Eileen Abad, Manuel Balbi, Carmen Villalobos, and Juan Pablo Shuk. The network debuted the novela on Monday, September 19, 2005 at the 7pm/6pm central timeslot, replacing Amarte así, Frijolito and concluded on July 24, 2006, being replaced by La viuda de Blanco.

Plot
Maria Teresa is a woman accustomed to living in the city, but she has to move to live at ‘La Tormenta’, her family’s estate, to try to save her family from financial ruin. The family is facing economic problems and she thinks La Tormenta will save them from bankruptcy.

Cast

Main 
 Natalia Streignard as María Teresa Montilla Marrero de Torrealba
 Christian Meier as Santos Torrealba / Santiago Guanipa
 Natasha Klauss as Isabella Montilla Manterola
 Marcelo Buquet as Simón Guerrero Carranza
 Aura Cristina Geithner as Bernarda Ayala
 Eileen Abad as Valentina Guerrero Ayala
 Juan Pablo Shuk as Father Damián / Cosme
 Kristina Lilley as Edelmira Carranza vda. de Guerrero
 María Cristina Gálvez as Remedios Segura de Camacho
 Iván Rodríguez as Cipriano Camacho
 Constanza Gutierrez as Tatacoa
 Rey Vásquez as Father Benito
 Alejandro Buenaventura as Ernesto Montilla
 Rosemary Bohórquez as Dalilah Gema
 Agmeth Escaf as Alirio Paiba
 Bibiana Navas as Sol "Solita" Cruz 
 Carmen Villalobos as Trinidad "Trini" Ayala Camacho
 Manuel Balbi as Jesús Niño Camacho Segura
 Sandra Pérez as Michelle Cardona
 Patricia Castañeda as Magdalena Camacho
 Vilma Vera as Chepa de Cruz
 Didier van der Hove as Enrique Montalvo
 Laila Vieira as Amapola
 Diana Neira as Virginia Montes
 Martha Isabel Bolaños as Camelia
 Margarita Durán as Genoveva
Davison Banda as Trigger/Trey Montezario
 Ricardo González as Demetrio Monaguia Lambió
 Carmen Marina Torres as Natividad / Nany

Recurring 
 Luis Gerónimo Abreu as Miguel Antonio "Miguelón" Camacho
 Gabriela Vergara as Ariana Santino Castell
Natalia Giraldo as Azalea Espinoza

Remake
 La tempestad is a Mexican telenovela to be produced by Salvador Mejía Alejandre for Televisa.

Awards

TVyNovelas Awards

References

External links
 

2005 telenovelas
Colombian telenovelas
RTI Producciones telenovelas
Telemundo telenovelas
Caracol Televisión telenovelas
2005 Colombian television series debuts
2006 Colombian television series endings
Spanish-language telenovelas
Television shows set in Bogotá